Gregory Kaplan is an American historian of Spanish Studies, currently a Distinguished Lindsay Young Professor at the University of Tennessee.

References

Year of birth missing (living people)
Living people
University of Tennessee faculty
21st-century American historians
21st-century American male writers
American male non-fiction writers